Belize competed at the 2020 Summer Olympics in Tokyo. Originally scheduled to take place from 24 July to 9 August 2020, the Games were postponed to 23 July to 8 August 2021, because of the COVID-19 pandemic. It was the nation's thirteenth appearance at the Olympics, although it previously appeared in two early editions under the name "British Honduras" (1968 in Mexico City, and 1972 in Munich).

Competitors
The following is the list of number of competitors in the Games.

Athletics

Belize received the universality slots from the World Athletics to send two track and field athletes (one per gender) to the Olympics.

Track & road events

Canoeing

Sprint
Belize received an invitation from the Tripartite Commission to send a canoeist in the men's K-1 1000 m to the Olympics, heralding the country's debut in the sport.

Qualification Legend: FA = Qualify to final (medal); FB = Qualify to final B (non-medal)

See also
Belize at the 2019 Pan American Games

References

Nations at the 2020 Summer Olympics
2020
Olympics